David Walter Del Tredici (born March 16, 1937) is an American composer. He has won a Pulitzer Prize for Music and is a former Guggenheim and Woodrow Wilson fellow. Del Tredici is considered a pioneer of the Neo-Romantic movement. He has also been described by the Los Angeles Times as "one of our most flamboyant outsider composers".

Early life and education
Del Tredici started his musical life as an aspiring pianist at the age of twelve, and has said that if he had not been a pianist, he would have become a florist. He attended the University of California, Berkeley, where he studied piano and played primarily Romantic works. At Berkeley, he attended the Aspen Music Festival and School. The pianist he was going to study with was "mean" to him, however, so Del Tredici tried his hand at composing music instead. He composed Opus 1, his first composition, and was invited to perform it for Darius Milhaud. After Milhaud complimented him on the piece, Del Tredici went back to Berkeley to concentrate on composition rather than performance.

During his early development as a composer, he found influence in his piano teachers Bernhard Abramovitch and Robert Helps, whom he found more creative and supportive of trusting "your instincts" than were his composition professors. After studying at the University of California, Berkeley, he attended Princeton University. There he studied composition with Roger Sessions, Earl Kim, and Seymour Shifrin.

At Princeton he was initially influenced by serialism, but abandoned that school of composition within a year of starting it. He left Princeton to live in New York City for two years before returning to the university.

Career
In 1964, Del Tredici met Aaron Copland at Tanglewood; they would be friends for the remainder of Copland's life, and his musical style remains an influence on Del Tredici.

Del Tredici taught at Harvard University, where he worked alongside Leon Kirchner, and was a part of the modernism movement. He has stated that "anything bad appeals to any young composer", including himself.

Much of Del Tredici's work has been inspired by literature, including author and poet James Joyce. As a fellow lapsed Catholic, Del Tredici was attracted to Joyce's struggles with his own Catholic past and "tortured life", which found voice in Del Tredici's "dissonant and nearly atonal" style. He also found inspiration in Martin Gardner's The Annotated Alice and its commentary on the works of Lewis Carroll. During this period, he found himself moving back towards tonality, which he felt was more appropriate for works such as his Final Alice and Adventures Underground.

Del Tredici was Composer-In-Residence at the New York Philharmonic from 1988 until 1990. In 1999 and 2000 he taught at Yale University. He also has taught at Boston University, Juilliard School, and the University of Buffalo. , he was a faculty member of the City College of New York.

Today, Del Tredici continues to draw on literature for his song cycles. His work has continued to draw on Lewis Carroll (particularly Alice in Wonderland), but he has also been inspired by contemporary American poets. He has also created works celebrating "gayness", acknowledging that many great composers were gay and that "it's something to be celebrated". A reviewer has noted that themes in his work examine "tormented relationships, personal transformations, and the joys and sorrows of gay life". He is a member of the American Academy of Arts and Letters and has held additional residencies at Yaddo, the Virginia Center for the Creative Arts, and the MacDowell Colony.

Works
Del Tredici has composed work for Michael Tilson Thomas and the Buffalo Philharmonic Orchestra. His work Adventures Underground drew inspiration from the poem The Mouse's Tail. Del Tredici has also composed works influenced by rock and folk music. He has written works for Phyllis Bryn-Julson, San Francisco Symphony, and the New York Philharmonic. He has also composed an opera and song cycles. He has written music using the work of, or as tribute to, Chana Bloch, Colette Inez, Allen Ginsberg, Thom Gunn, Paul Monette, and Alfred Corn.

His In Memory of a Summer Day (part one of Child Alice) won Del Tredici a Pulitzer Prize. That piece would be developed into a ballet, which has been performed by the National Ballet of Canada and the Grand Théâtre de Genève. In 1988, his work Tattoo, commissioned by the Concertgebouw Orchestra, was debuted by Leonard Bernstein and the New York Philharmonic.

1988, Tattoo, Concertgebouw Orchestra
1990, Steps, New York Philharmonic
1998, The Spider and the Fly, New York Philharmonic
1998, Chana's Story, San Francisco Contemporary Players
1999, Dracula, Eos Orchestra
2003, In Wartime, University of Texas at Austin Wind Ensemble
2004, Gotham Glory, fp. 15 March 2005, Anthony de Mare, piano
2004, Syzygy, Asko Ensemble
2013, Bullycide, La Jolla Music Society

Recognition
Guggenheim Fellowship
Pulitzer Prize for Music
Woodrow Wilson Fellowship
Kennedy Center Friedheim Award

References

External links

Interview with David Del Tredici, January 8, 1990

1937 births
Living people
People from Cloverdale, California
American people of Italian descent
Aspen Music Festival and School alumni
20th-century classical composers
21st-century classical composers
University of California, Berkeley alumni
Princeton University alumni
American male classical composers
American classical composers
Pulitzer Prize for Music winners
Members of the American Academy of Arts and Letters
American LGBT musicians
LGBT classical composers
LGBT classical musicians
Composers for piano
Pupils of Roger Sessions
21st-century American composers
20th-century American composers
20th-century American male musicians
21st-century American male musicians
Music & Arts artists
University at Buffalo faculty
21st-century American LGBT people
Yaddo alumni